GH4 may refer to:

 Guitar Hero World Tour
 Panasonic Lumix DMC-GH4, a digital camera with 4K resolution video recording capability